is the twelfth single by Bump of Chicken, released on November 22, 2006. The title track is from the album Orbital Period.

Track listing
 (Hometown of Tears) (Fujiwara Motoo)
 (Did You See the Red Sky?) (Fujiwara)
 (House Sitter) (Hidden track)

Personnel
Fujiwara Motoo — Guitar, vocals
Masukawa Hiroaki — Guitar
Naoi Yoshifumi — Bass
Masu Hideo — Drums

Chart performance

References

External links
涙のふるさと on the official Bump of Chicken website.

2006 singles
Bump of Chicken songs
Oricon Weekly number-one singles